The UEFA Women's Coach of the Year Award is an association football award given to the manager coaching a women's football club in Europe that is considered the best in the previous season of both club and national team competition. The award, created in 2020 by UEFA in partnership with European Sports Media (ESM) group, was announced alongside the UEFA Men's Coach of the Year Award.

Criteria
According to UEFA, for this award, "coaches in Europe, irrespective of nationality, [are] judged in regard to their performances over the whole season in all competitions – both domestically and internationally – at either club, or national team level."

Voting
For the inaugural award, the eight coaches from the clubs that participated in the quarter-finals of that year's UEFA Women's Champions League, along with 20 sports journalists selected by the European Sports Media group specializing in women's football, provided a list of their three best-ranked coaches from one to three, with the first player receiving five points, the second three points and the third one point. Coaches were not allowed to vote for themselves. The three coaches with the most points overall were shortlisted, and the winner was announced during the group stage draw of the next season's UEFA Champions League.

Award history

Winners

Finalists

2019–20

2020–21

2021–22

See also
 UEFA Club Football Awards
 UEFA Men's Coach of the Year Award
 The Best FIFA Football Coach

References

Coach
European football trophies and awards